The Nederlandse Spoorwegen (NS) Class 1700 is a class of electric locomotives built by Alstom in 1990-1994.

Description 
The Class 1700 locomotives were built by Alstom in 1990-1994. 81 of these locomotives, numbered 1701-1781, were built.

The Class 1600 was ordered in 1978, after several types of locomotives were tested in the 1970s. One of those was the French Class BB 7200, on which the 1600 is based. The 58 locomotives were delivered between 1981 and 1983. As a result of their delivery, the old Class 1000 and Class 1500 were taken out of service.

Thanks to the electronic power control, these locomotives were the most economical but also the most powerful locomotives that Dutch Railways had.

The Class 1700 are similar but not entirely equal to the Class 1600/1800. The newer 1700 series have updated and extended electronics, a newer safety system (ATB phase 4 vs ATB phase 3 in the 1600 series) and a different braking system. The locomotives are fitted with monomotor bogies.

Most visual difference between the 1700 and 16/1800 series is the automatic coupler on 1701-1728 subseries. These locomotives are used with NS DD-AR double-decker coaches in a push-pull setup and treated as an EMU. The couplers, from BSI (Bergische Stahl Industrie, Germany), allow a mechanical, pneumatic and electrical connection between two DD-AR sets. From the remaining 1729-1781 series a large number are converted to be used in push-pull sets with coaches from the rebuild ICRm series. Several of these coaches have been rebuilt with a drivers cab, allowing the loco to be remotely controlled. When not used in push-pull service, the loco is used in regular trains, available for maintenance or as reserve.

nDDm 
In 2012, many were put back in service with former nDDm double-decker cars and driving cars for Sprinter services. The carriages were withdrawn in 2018.

Fleet list 

In 2010, the Dutch Railways took a few class 1700 out of service because there wasn't enough work for all locomotives. Number 1735 has been scrapped, due to a devastating fire, which occurred on 24 February 2000 in Venlo. Refurbishment was too expensive, so the loco was scrapped in 2002. Some locomotives carry names of towns and cities in the Netherlands, the table underneath shows which engines.

 t = These engines have been taken out of service and are not expected to return in service in the near future.
 † = This engine has been scrapped

References

1700
Alstom locomotives
B-B locomotives
1500 V DC locomotives
Electric locomotives of the Netherlands
Standard gauge locomotives of the Netherlands
Railway locomotives introduced in 1990